The Riverina Anglican College is an independent  Anglican co-educational secondary day school, located in , in the Riverina region of New South Wales, Australia. Established in January 1999, the College is located on Farrer Road in Boorooma, adjacent to the Charles Sturt University Wagga campus.

Principals
The following individuals served as Principal of the Riverina Anglican College:

Facilities
The Riverina Anglican College has various facilities, including but not limited to full design and technology workshop facilities, a gymnasium, an extensive library, and a music and drama building.

See also 

 List of Anglican schools in New South Wales
 Anglican education in Australia

References

External links
 The Riverina Anglican College website

Educational institutions established in 1999
Anglican secondary schools in New South Wales
Education in Wagga Wagga
1999 establishments in Australia
Anglican Diocese of Sydney